Last Minute may refer to:

The Last Minute, a film from Stephen Norrington
"Last Minute", a song from Marcin Rozynek's album Ubieranie do snu
Last Minute (band), a band formed by Ryan Primack
"Last Minute" (Continuum), the third-season finale of the Canadian television series, Continuum
lastminute.com, a British travel company